Triplophysa bombifrons is a species of ray-finned fish, a stoneloach in the genus Triplophysa. Some authorities classify it in the separate genus or subgenus Tarimichthys. It is endemic to the Tarim River in Xinjiang.

References

bombifrons
Taxa named by Solomon Herzenstein
Fish described in 1888